Juan Adrian is a town in the Monseñor Nouel province of the Dominican Republic.

Sources 
 – World-Gazetteer.com

Populated places in Monseñor Nouel Province